The Stoke river (in French: rivière Stoke) is a tributary of the Saint-François River, in the administrative region of Estrie, on the South Shore of the St. Lawrence River, in Quebec, Canada. The course of the Stoke River successively crosses the territories of the municipalities of:
 Le Haut-Saint-François Regional County Municipality: municipality of Dudswell;
 Le Val-Saint-François Regional County Municipality: municipalities of Stoke and Val-Joli.

Geography 

The main neighboring hydrographic slopes of the Stoke River are:
 north side: Watopeka River, lac Boissonneault;
 east side: Watopeka River;
 south side: Saint-François River;
 west side: Saint-François River.

Brabant Lake constitutes the head lake of the Stoke River. This lake is located in the municipality of Dudswell, north-west of the village of "Saint-Adolphe-de-Dudswell" and Lac d'Argent in the Le Haut-Saint-François Regional County Municipality, as well as east of Saint-Camille (MRC of Asbestos).

From Brabant Lake, the Stoke River flows over:
  to the south;
  southwest, to route 255;
  southwesterly, up to the municipal boundary between Dudswell and Stoke;
  southwesterly, along route 216 and passing through the hamlet of Duplin, to the bridge located east of village of Stoke;
  southwesterly, passing northwest of the village of Stoke, to the outlet of Stoke Lake (coming from the south);

The Stoke River empties on the east bank of the Watopeka River.

Toponymy 

The toponym "Rivière Stoke" was officially registered on December 5, 1968, at the Commission de toponymie du Québec.

See also 

 List of rivers of Quebec

References 

Le Val-Saint-François Regional County Municipality
Rivers of Estrie
Le Haut-Saint-François Regional County Municipality